Sangsadia Nirbachan 2001 (Bengali: সংসদীয় নির্বাচন ২০০১), is a military medal of Bangladesh. The medal was established in 2001. The medal is intended for awarding citizens of the country who took part in the organization of general parliamentary elections.

References 

Military awards and decorations of Bangladesh